Joan Cornellà Vázquez (born 11 January 1981) is a Spanish cartoonist and illustrator, famous for his unsettling, surreal humor and black humor comic strips as well as artwork.

Biography 
Joan Cornellà Vázquez was born in Barcelona, Spain on 11 January 1981. Having graduated in fine arts, he has collaborated for numerous publications, such as La cultura del Duodeno, El Periódico, Ara and has illustrated for The New York Times.

In 2009 he won the third edition of the Josep Coll Prize with his album Abulio, published in the next year by Glénat. Since 2010, he has provided cartoons for the Spanish magazine El Jueves.

In 2012, Fracasa Mejor, a selection of Cornellà's black-and-white cartoons made from 2010 to 2012, was published. Most of the material was previously unpublished, although it also contains material published in El Jueves and various other fanzines.

In 2013, a third album of his, Mox Nox, was published via Bang Ediciones.

Cornellà collaborated with visual designer Stefania Lusini in 2016 as an illustrator for the cover of Wilco's tenth studio album, Schmilco.

Bibliography

References

External links 

 

1981 births
Artists from Catalonia
Culture in Barcelona
Living people
People from Barcelona
Spanish cartoonists
Spanish surrealist artists
Surreal comedy
21st-century Spanish artists